Lesley Jill Clifford (19 January 1937 – 12 May 1979) was an English cricketer who played primarily as a slow left-arm orthodox bowler. She appeared in 9 Test matches and 5 One Day Internationals for England between 1966 and 1973. She played domestic cricket for Yorkshire and Southern Transvaal.

References

External links
 
 

1937 births
1979 deaths
Cricketers from Leeds
England women Test cricketers
England women One Day International cricketers
Yorkshire women cricketers
Central Gauteng women cricketers